Saeid Taghizadeh (born 15 August 1988) is an Iranian professional futsal player. He is currently a member of Ghand Katrin in the Iranian Futsal Super League.

Honours 
 AFC Futsal Club Championship
 Champion (2): 2012 (Giti Pasand), 2018 (Mes Sungun)
 Runners-up (2): 2013 (Giti Pasand), 2019 (Mes Sungun)
 Iranian Futsal Super League
 Champion (4): 2012–13 (Giti Pasand),  2017–18 (Mes Sungun), 2018–19 (Mes Sungun), 2019–20 (Mes Sungun)
 Runners-up (2): 2013–14 (Giti Pasand), 2014–15 (Giti Pasand)

References 

1988 births
Living people
People from Qom
Iranian men's futsal players
Futsal defenders
Almas Shahr Qom FSC players
Giti Pasand FSC players
Shahrdari Saveh FSC players
Mes Sungun FSC players
Iranian expatriate futsal players
Iranian expatriate sportspeople in Iraq